The Haven-White House is a historic house at 229 Pleasant Street in Portsmouth, New Hampshire.  Built about 1800 for a prosperous merchant, it is an important early example of the city's Federal architecture, with numerous high-quality interior features, and a rare surviving period stable.  The property was listed on the National Register of Historic Places in 1985.

Description and history
The Haven-White House is located south of central Portsmouth, on the north side of Pleasant Street at its junction with Richmond Street.  It is a three-story wood-frame structure, with a hip roof, interior chimneys, and a clapboarded exterior.  A three-story ell projects to the left rear, giving it a facade of similar length facing Richmond Street as its main facade, which faces Pleasant.  The main facade is five bays wide, with a center entrance flanked by slender Federal-style engaged columns and topped by a gabled pediment.  Windows are topped by shouldered surrounds with slightly projecting caps, and the main eave has dentil moulding encircling the building.  The interior retains many high-quality examples of Federal period woodwork, including an extremely rare in situ bust of the poet John Milton.  The second-floor southwest bedchamber contains one of the city's most complete expressions of high-style Federal woodwork.

The house was built about 1799 or 1800 for Joseph Haven, a prosperous merchant.  The stable at the rear of the property is a two-story building dating to the same period, which includes keystoned arches over its major openings, and a period oculus window.

See also
National Register of Historic Places listings in Rockingham County, New Hampshire

References

Houses on the National Register of Historic Places in New Hampshire
Federal architecture in New Hampshire
Houses completed in 1799
Houses in Portsmouth, New Hampshire
National Register of Historic Places in Portsmouth, New Hampshire